The 2011 Basel Summer Ice Hockey is an ice hockey tournament that was held in Basel, Switzerland between 17 and 21 August 2011. All matches were played at host EHC Basel's home St. Jakob Arena. Six teams, split into two groups of three, took part.

Teams participating
The list of teams that have been confirmed for the tournament are as listed:

 EHC Basel Sharks (host)
 Barys Astana
 JYP Jyväskylä
 Krefeld Pinguine
 SC Bern
 SKA Saint Petersburg

Group stage

Key
W (regulation win) – 3 pts.
OTW (overtime/shootout win) – 2 pts.
OTL (overtime/shootout loss) – 1 pt.
L (regulation loss) – 0 pts.

Group Urs-Dieter Jud

All times are local (UTC+2).

Group René Nebel

All times are local (UTC+2).

Knockout stage

Key: * – final in overtime. ** – final in shootout.

Fifth-place Match

All times are local (UTC+2).

Semifinals

All times are local (UTC+2).

Third-place Match

All times are local (UTC+2).

Final

All times are local (UTC+2).

Champions

References

External links

2011–12
2011–12 in Swiss ice hockey
2011–12 in Russian ice hockey
2011–12 in German ice hockey
2011–12 in Finnish ice hockey